Franz Wilhelm (7 September 1884 – 25 February 1968) was a Swiss fencer. He competed in the team épée event at the 1920 Summer Olympics.

References

External links
 

1884 births
1968 deaths
Swiss male épée fencers
Olympic fencers of Switzerland
Fencers at the 1920 Summer Olympics
People from La Chaux-de-Fonds
Sportspeople from the canton of Neuchâtel